Fiction Records is a British record label founded by Chris Parry in 1978, owned by Universal Music Group and based in the United Kingdom. It is best known for being the home of The Cure for over 20 years. It was originally a part of Polydor, but in January 2014, Universal restructured Fiction as a standalone label, removing it from Polydor's corporate affiliation. Fiction repertoire is now released internationally through Virgin (ex-North America).

History
Fiction Records was founded in the late 1970s by Polydor A&R man, and longtime The Cure manager Chris Parry, alongside music publisher Fiction Songs Ltd, and who went on to found Radio X (then XFM London) and both were subsidiaries of Polydor Records, and based in London at 97 Charlotte Street and eventually maintained a satellite office in New York City at 850 7th Ave. Fiction was also home to UK dance label Desire, re-launched in 1988 as Fiction's house subdivision, and Non Fiction Records, Fiction's specialty label for special editions. Fiction was best known for The Cure's releases and achieved its first UK No. 1 album in 1992 with The Cure's Wish; the album's lead single "Friday I'm In Love" also topped Billboard'''s Modern Rock chart. Additionally, Fiction was home to other artists who signed to the publishing company  as well as the record label and released a number of acclaimed albums including Eat's Sell Me a God (Fiction/Polydor) in 1989, The God Machine's Scenes from the Second Storey (Fiction/Polydor) in 1993 and Die Warzau's Engine (Fiction/Wax Trax!) in 1995. Other artists who were part of the Fiction roster and publishing catalog during this time included Billy Mackenzie & The Associates, Candyland, The Purple Hearts, Cult Hero and The Passions.

Starting in 1995, Fiction became dormant as a label, apart from the occasional Cure release, and focused exclusively on Fiction Songs, who partnered with Bertelsmann Music Group to form a joint venture publishing company and moved their New York offices to the Bertelsmann Building at 1540 Broadway in Times Square in 1994; Fiction's headquarters were unchanged. However, BMG eventually acquired Fiction Songs and its catalog in 2001. Besides being the publisher for the Cure and other Fiction artists, Fiction Songs was also home to hip hop/electronic artist Stereo MCs, producer and songwriter Cameron McVey, the Jungle Brothers, Primitive Radio Gods, and NY Loose.
 
In 1992, the Fiction headquarters at Charlotte Street served as the first home to XFM London co founded by Parry. A benefit concert called 'Great Xpectations' was held in support of the station on 13 June 1993 at Finsbury Park in London. A live album of the concert titled Great Xpectations Live was released in July 1993 on Fiction and included performances by The Cure, Damon Albarn & Graham Coxon, Belly and Catherine Wheel.

In January 2004, Joe Munns, Paul Smernicki and Beastman revived Fiction to "give Polydor a bit more of a guitar stronghold", as their roster then consisted mostly of pop acts. The first release on the "new" Fiction was the Snow Patrol single "Run", which entered the UK Singles Chart at No. 5. The subsequent Snow Patrol album, Final Straw'', went on to sell over two million copies worldwide. In January 2014, Universal Music Group restructured Fiction as a standalone label, removing it from Polydor's corporate affiliation.

Artists 
The current Fiction stable includes Crystal Castles, Tame Impala, The Mysterines, Death From Above 1979, The Maccabees, Spector, HEALTH, Mini Mansions, Fryars, Kate Boy, Meanwhile, Palace, The Amazons, Another Sky, The Big Moon and Kaiser Chiefs.

Fiction has also released records by The Naked And Famous, Kate Nash, Athlete, Elbow, White Lies, Yuksek, Stephen Fretwell, Ian Brown, Jacknife Lee, Delays, Alberta Cross, Guillemots and Yeah Yeah Yeahs.

See also
 List of record labels

References

External links
 Fiction Records Official Website
 Shop Fiction Records
 Fiction Records Discography
 Desire Records Discography
 Non Fiction Discography
 Fiction Records in Music Week - May 2015
 Interview with Fiction A&R Jim Chancellor, HitQuarters Oct 2005
 Fiction Records in Music Week - May 2015
 Interview with Fiction A&R Jim Chancellor, HitQuarters Oct 2005

British record labels
Record labels established in 1978
Labels distributed by Universal Music Group
The Cure